The Sum of Us is a 1994 Australian LGBT-related comedy-drama film directed by Kevin Dowling and Geoff Burton. The film is based on the 1990 play of the same name by David Stevens, who also wrote the screenplay. The film stars Russell Crowe and Jack Thompson. The screen adaptation mimics the play's device of breaking the fourth wall with direct to camera conversational asides by both Harry and Jeff Mitchell.

Plot
Widower Harry Mitchell (Thompson) lives with his gay son Jeff (Crowe), with both men struggling in their searches for true love. Harry is completely comfortable with his son's sexuality, and is almost over-eager in his support for his son's search for a boyfriend. Harry meets an attractive but judgmental divorcee through a dating service, and this leads to some conflict between the two main characters. However, when Harry suffers a stroke and loses the power of speech, the story takes a darker turn, becoming a meditation on the enduring strength of love, both familial and romantic, in the face of adversity.

Cast
 Jack Thompson as Harry Mitchell
 Russell Crowe as Jeff Mitchell
 John Polson as Greg
 Deborah Kennedy as Joyce Johnson
 Joss Moroney as Young Jeff
 Mitch Mathews as Gran
 Julie Herbert as Mary
 Des James as Football Coach
 Mick Campbell as Footballer
 Donny Muntz as Ferry Captain
 Jan Adele as Barmaid
 Rebekah Elmaloglou as Jenny Johnson
 Lola Nixon as Desiree
 Sally Cahill as Greg's Mother
 Bob Baines as Greg's Father

Box office
The Sum of Us grossed $3,827,456 at the box office in Australia.

Awards
The film was nominated for Best Film and Stevens' screenplay won Best Adapted Screenplay at the 1994 Australian Film Institute Awards, while Polson and Kennedy were nominated for best supporting actors, and Frans Vanderburg for editing and the sound team. Other accolades came at the Montreal World Film Festival, and the film was named Best Film at the Cleveland International Film Festival.

See also

 Cinema of Australia
 Russell Crowe filmography

References

External links
 
 
The Sum of Us at Oz Movies

1994 films
1994 comedy-drama films
1994 LGBT-related films
1990s coming-of-age comedy-drama films
1990s romantic comedy-drama films
Australian films based on plays
Australian coming-of-age comedy-drama films
Australian LGBT-related films
Australian romantic comedy-drama films
Coming-of-age romance films
1990s English-language films
Films based on works by Australian writers
Films directed by Kevin Dowling
Films scored by Brad Fiedel
Films shot in Sydney
Gay-related films
Lesbian-related films
LGBT-related coming-of-age films
LGBT-related romantic comedy-drama films
The Samuel Goldwyn Company films
1990s Australian films